Alberto Martín-Artajo Álvarez (2 October 1905, in Madrid – 31 August 1979, in Madrid) was a legal technocrat for the Nationalist government during the Spanish Civil War and for the succeeding reign of caudillo Francisco Franco, and a Spanish Minister of Foreign Affairs. He served as the Foreign Minister from 1945 to 1957. Ideologically, he was not a Falangist (a member of the original Falange Española, the fascist-like party, before it absorbed the other anti-Republican parties), but a monarchist and a leader of the dynamic and powerful Catholic movement within the Francoist coalition. During the time of the Second Spanish Republic, he had been a member of the Spanish Confederation of the Autonomous Right (CEDA, existed 1933–1937).

He received his secondary education at Our Lady of Remembrance College, Madrid. Martín-Artajo earned a law degree from the University of Madrid. He became a staff attorney of the Council of State in 1931. During the Republic, Martín-Artajo worked closely with Ángel Herrera Oria, the director of the Catholic newspaper El Debate and belonged to the lay "National Catholic Association of Propagators of the Faith" (propagandistas). With the start of the Spanish Civil War, Martín-Artajo went over to the insurgent Nationalists. He was a legal adviser to the Nationalist government's Junta Técnica del Estado (State Technical Council), Franco's cabinet, and to the Nationalist government's Labor Ministry. In 1940, Generalissimo Franco appointed him president of the mass movement, Catholic Action.

In 1945, Martín-Artajo participated in the drafting of the quasiconstitutional "Fuero of the Spanish People", a list of rights, freedoms, and responsibilities.

In July 1945, fresh after the defeat of the Third Reich, Franco wanted to present the Spanish government as "Catholic" rather than a profascist, in the face of ostracism from other Western countries. Franco wanted to appoint Martín-Artajo Minister of Foreign Affairs. After consulting with the Primate of Spain, Cardinal Enrique Pla y Deniel, he accepted the portfolio of Foreign Affairs and resigned from his position at Catholic Action. His diplomatic efforts succeeded in breaking Spain's isolation. On 8 March 1953, Martìn-Artajo received the Ancient Order of Sikatuna for his "exceptional and meritorious services to the Republic of the Philippines", becoming the first person to be given the honor after its creation. He effectuated the signing of the Concordat with the Holy See in August 1953, the bilateral Pact of Madrid with the United States the following September, and Spain's entry into the United Nations in 1955.

After retiring from the Foreign Ministry, he worked on the Council of State and at the publisher, Editorial Católica.

Notes

References

Sources

Further reading
Tusell, Javier. 2007. Spain: From Dictatorship to Democracy: 1939 to the Present. Blackwell.

1905 births
1979 deaths
Foreign ministers of Spain
Grand Crosses 1st class of the Order of Merit of the Federal Republic of Germany
People from Madrid
Foreign relations of Spain during the Francoist dictatorship
Government ministers during the Francoist dictatorship